Bijoy Smarani Degree College is a private, pass-level degree college in Sitakunda Upazila, Chittagong District, Bangladesh. It is affiliated with National University.

History 

In 1993, with some help of local educated people the college started its journey. It was started with only 93 students. But now there are about 2000 students in this college. College level and Honours level, both were started in 1993. Late Master Mucha Ahmed Chowdhury founded the college with some local people.
The first principal was Abdur Rahim Chowdhury.

Facilities 
The college has a computer lab, library and playing equipment for students. It also has cultural programs for students.

References

Colleges in Chittagong
Universities and colleges in Chittagong